Nan (南), Nangong (南宮), Nanguo (南郭) is a Chinese surname.

Nan 南

Henan (河南) Based Nan (南) family Founded with Patronymic Nan (南) 
during the Xia Dynasty, Si (姒) family get surname (南)
during the Zhou Dynasty, Ji (姬) family get surname (南) 
two-syllable surname Nangong (南宮), Nanguo (南郭) reduce surname to Nan (南)
during the Han Dynasty, other Nan (南) family founded in Zhejiang
 There is a large population of Nan families in Guayaquil, Ecuador. This Nan family migrated from China to Ecuador in the early 1940s.

Nangong 南宮
Nangong (南宮) is a two-syllable family name from the city name "Nangong" (南宮), later reduce a surname to Nan (南).

Nanguo 南郭
Nanguo (南郭) is a two-syllable family name from old city name "Nanguo" (南郭), later reduce a surname to Nan (南). during the Zhou Dynasty, Guo Shu (虢叔) lived in Nanguo (南郭).
Nanguo River (南果河) is a right-hand tributary of Mekong river in Menghai County, Yunnan, China

Nan 難 / 难
Nan (難) is another family name based in Henan but originate from Xianbei surname "Tunan" (吐難) during the Northern dynasties. Now this surname is rare in Henan, and some descendants are now living in Korea.

Chinese-language surnames
Multiple Chinese surnames